Steamboat Springs may refer to:

Steamboat Springs, Colorado, U.S., a city
Steamboat Springs Airport
Steamboat Springs High School
Steamboat Springs (Nevada), U.S., a volcanic field with extensive geothermal activity

See also
 Steamboat Geyser, in Yellowstone National Park

 
 Steamboat (disambiguation)
 Spring (disambiguation)